Bumang is a tonal Austroasiatic language of Yunnan, China. It is spoken by about 200 people in Manzhang (曼仗), Mengla District (勐拉地区), Jinping County, Honghe Prefecture. The existence of Bumang was only recently documented by Chinese linguist Dao Jie in the mid-2000s. It is closely related to Kháng.

Classification
Jerold A. Edmondson (2010) considers Bumang and the closely related Kháng language to be Khmuic languages based on lexical evidence, while Dao Jie (刀洁, 2007) proposes that Bumang may be a Palaungic language.

Although Bumang and Mang have similar names and are both spoken in Honghe Prefecture of Yunnan Province in China, they are not closely related and do not appear to be in the same branch together. Whereas Edmondson considers Bumang to likely be a Khmuic language, Mang is not one, and is more closely related to the Bolyu and Bugan languages of southern China.

Population
In China, the Bumang are classified as part of the Dai nationality. Bumang speakers are surrounded by speakers of White Tai (Tai Don), Black Tai (Tai Dam), and Pu'er Dai. Bumang women's clothing is identical to that of the Kháng, Ksingmul, White Tai, and Black Tai.

Within Manzhang (曼仗), Mengla District (勐拉地区), Bumang is spoken in Shangmanzhang (上曼仗, with 22 households; known in the Bumang language as ) and Xiamanzhang (下曼仗, with 49 households). Shangmanzhang (上曼仗) is located in Tiantou Village (田头村), Mengla Township (勐拉乡), while Xiamanzhang (下曼仗) is situated on a state-run rubber plantation (国营橡胶农场).

The Bumang are descended from Kháng people who had immigrated from Vietnam in the 1800s.

Phonology
Like Kháng, Bumang is a tonal language.

References

Works cited

External links
Bumang numerals at Lingweb.eva.mpg.de
ISO 639-3 Registration Authority Request for New Language Code Element in ISO 639-3 (change request number: 2012-048)
ISO 639-3 Registration Authority Request for Change to ISO 639-3 Language Code  (change request number: 2012-048)

Khmuic languages
Mangic languages
Languages of Yunnan
Tonal languages